The New York Yankees are a professional baseball team based in the Bronx, New York. They compete in the East Division of Major League Baseball's (MLB) American League (AL). The club began play in 1903 as the Highlanders, after owners Frank Farrell and William S. Devery had bought the defunct Baltimore Orioles and moved the team to New York City; in 1913, the team changed its nickname to the Yankees. From 1903 to 2022, the franchise has won more than 10,000 games and 27 World Series championships. The list below documents players and teams that hold particular club records.

Outfielder Babe Ruth holds the most franchise records, with 16, including career home runs, and career and single-season batting average and on-base percentage. Shortstop Derek Jeter has the second-most records among hitters, with eight. Jeter's marks include the records for career hits, singles, doubles, and stolen bases. Among pitchers, Whitey Ford has the most Yankees records with five, all of which are career totals. These include games won, games started, and innings pitched.

Several Yankees hold AL and MLB records. Ruth has MLB single-season records for extra-base hits and total bases, and holds four other AL single-season records. Outfielder Joe DiMaggio had a 56-game hitting streak in the 1941 season, which remains an MLB record. Jack Chesbro holds three AL records that he set in 1904: games won, games started, and complete games. Outfielder Aaron Judge set an AL record with 62 home runs in 2022, beating the mark of 61 that fellow Yankee Roger Maris posted in 1961.

Table key

Statistics are current through the 2022 season.

Individual career records
These are records of players with the best performance in particular statistical categories during their career with the Yankees.

Career batting

Career pitching

Individual single-season records
These are records of Yankees players with the best performance in particular statistical categories during a single season.

Single-season batting

Single-season pitching

Team single-game records
These are records of Yankees teams with the best performance in particular statistical categories during a single game.

Single-game batting

Single-game pitching

Other

Team season records
These are records of Yankees teams with the best and worst performances in particular statistical categories during a single season.

Season batting

Season pitching

Team all-time records
Source:

See also
Baseball statistics
New York Yankees award winners and league leaders

Notes
The figure listed is the MLB total. Baseball-Reference.com credits Rivera with 952 games finished.

References

Records
New York Yankees